The Kingdom of Seville was a territorial jurisdiction of the Crown of Castile since 1248 until Javier de Burgos' provincial division of Spain in 1833. This was a "kingdom" ("reino") in the second sense given by the Diccionario de la lengua española de la Real Academia Española: the Crown of Castile consisted of several such kingdoms. Seville was one of the Four Kingdoms of Andalusia. Its extent is detailed in Respuestas Generales del Catastro de Ensenada (1750–54), which was part of the documentation of a census. Falling largely within the present day autonomous community of Andalucia, it included roughly the territory of the present-day provinces of Huelva, Seville, and Cádiz, the Antequera Depression in the present-day province of Málaga, and also some municipalities in the present-day autonomous communities of Extremadura in the province of Badajoz.

Like the other kingdoms within Spain, the Kingdom of Seville was abolished by the 1833 territorial division of Spain.

See also
 Seville
 :es:Anexo:Localidades del Reino de Sevilla, a list of the localities that composed the Kingdom of Jaén, according to the Catastro of Ensenada (1750–54); this page is an appendix to the Spanish-language Wikipedia.

Notes 

History of Andalusia
Kingdom of Seville
1248 establishments in Europe
1833 disestablishments in Spain
13th-century establishments in Castile